The 1900 Massachusetts gubernatorial election was held on November 5, 1900. Incumbent Republican Governor W. Murray Crane was re-elected to a second term in office.

General election

Results

See also
 1900 Massachusetts legislature

References

Governor
1900
Massachusetts
November 1900 events